John Earl Millman (August 4, 1930 – June 12, 2021) was a Canadian cyclist. He competed in the men's sprint event at the 1952 Summer Olympics. He also competed in the men's 10 mile scratch and 1km time trials at the 1950 British Empire (Commonwealth) Games in Auckland, New Zealand, and was a heat winner of the 1000m Match Sprint at the 1954 British Empire (Commonwealth) Games in Vancouver, Canada. Millman died in Middlesbrough, England on June 12, 2021, at the age of 90.

References

External links
 

1930 births
2021 deaths
Canadian male cyclists
Cyclists at the 1952 Summer Olympics
Olympic cyclists of Canada
American emigrants to Canada
Sportspeople from Portland, Oregon